Nigel Carr (born 27 July 1959) was an Ireland rugby union international whose promising career was cut short due to injuries sustained in an IRA bomb explosion.

Early life
Nigel John Carr was born in Belfast on 27 July 1959. He won Irish U-23 and 'B' caps in 1979 plus further 'B' appearances in 1980, 1982 and 1984, before winning his first senior cap in 1985.

Senior rugby career
Carr was renowned as one half of an extremely effective back-row duo along with Phillip Matthews. They played together at Regent House Grammar School, Queen's University, Ards RFC, Ulster and Ireland in the late 1970s and into the 1980s.

Carr made his senior international debut against Scotland at Murrayfield on 2 February 1985 and was part of the Triple Crown winning side of 1985. He was on the subsequent 1985 Japan tour. He won his 12th and final cap in 1987 against Wales at Cardiff Arms Park. Carr missed out on the inaugural 1987 Rugby World Cup because he was forced to prematurely end his career through injuries due to an IRA car-bomb. On 25 April 1987, Carr, David Irwin and Philip Rainey had set off for a training session in Dublin before the World Cup. On that day the IRA had targeted Lord Justice Sir Maurice Gibson - Northern Ireland's second most senior judge - who was travelling back from holiday with his wife, Lady Cecily Gibson, and a 500 lb land mine was detonated at Killean, on the border, killing them both. The three Ireland internationals were on the same stretch of road when the bomb exploded and although miraculously, they all escaped serious injury, the explosion ended Carr's rugby career at just 27. Carr has been described as one of the best players to have pulled on the Irish jersey. Carr, although he never toured with the Lions, did play for them against The Rest of the World in a one-off game in Cardiff in 1986. He also played for the Barbarians.

Career and personal life
Dr Nigel Carr works for Invest NI in Belfast and previously also produced and presented a UTV sports programme, 'Sport on Sunday'.

References

1959 births
Living people
Rugby union players from Belfast
Irish rugby union players
British & Irish Lions rugby union players from Ireland
Rugby union flankers
Alumni of Queen's University Belfast
Ireland international rugby union players
Car bomb victims
People educated at Regent House Grammar School
Ulster Rugby players